Hutty is a surname. Notable people with the surname include:

Abbie Hutty (born 1986/1987), British mechanical engineer
Alfred Hutty (1877–1954), American painter